Kamalpur, Assam Assembly constituency or Kamalpur (Assam Assembly constituency) is one of the 126 assembly constituencies of Assam Legislative Assembly. Kamalpur forms part of the Mangaldoi Lok Sabha constituency.

Members of Legislative Assembly 
 1951: Mohendranath Deka, Independent
 1957: Sarat Chandra Goswami, Indian National Congress
 1962: Sarat Chandra Goswami, Indian National Congress
 1967: L. Choudhury, Praja Socialist Party
 1972: Girindra Choudhury, Indian National Congress
 1978: Daibasakti Deka, Janata Party
 1983: Mathura Deka, Communist Party of India
 1985: Maidul Islam Bora, Independent
 1991: Dr Hitesh Deka, Natun Asom Gana Parishad
 1996: Maidul Islam Bora, Asom Gana Parishad
 2001: Uttara Kalita, Indian National Congress
 2006: Uttara Kalita, Indian National Congress
 2011: Jadab Chandra Deka, Bharatiya Janata Party
 2016: Satyabrat Kalita, Asom Gana Parishad
 2021: Diganta Kalita, Bharatiya Janata Party

Election results

2016 result

See also
List of constituencies of the Assam Legislative Assembly

References

External links 
 

Assembly constituencies of Assam